The Adelaide Club is an exclusive gentlemen's club situated on North Terrace in the South Australian capital city of Adelaide. Founded in 1863, the club comprises members of the Adelaide Establishment.

South Australian Club (1838–1843)
An earlier club with similar aims and membership was the South Australian Club, founded in 1838, which purchased the Victoria Hotel from William Williams on Hindley Street for their premises. Members included Sturt, Morphett and Fisher. Membership was by ballot; joining fee 10 gns., membership 2 gns. per annum. It folded in 1843 after failing financially.

History and description
The club's headquarters are at the club house at 165 North Terrace in the city centre. The club house was built in the same year as the club's establishment in 1864, after  14 prominent colonists, including John Baker, John Morphett and Arthur Blyth, raised  £4000 for the building. The building was designed by  one of the founding members, Edward Angus Hamilton, and the club adopted the grass tree as their crest.

The majority of the founding members were pastoralists, with a large number of businessmen, and there were many lawyers and government officials among them. Most were Anglicans.

In 1891 extensive additions were made to the rear. In 1980, the club house was listed on the now-defunct Register of the National Estate.  Facilities include a library, mixed accommodation for members and reciprocal club members, dining rooms, billiards room, function rooms and office facilities.

Equivalent women's club
The equivalent elite club for women, the Queen Adelaide Club, is located a short distance to the east along North Terrace.

Notable members

Members of the Adelaide Club have included:

George Fife Angas
John Howard Angas
Henry Ayers
John Baker
Robert Barr Smith
Arthur Blyth
David Brookman
Roy Burston
George W. Cotton
Darcy Rivers Warren Cowan
Alexander Downer
Lloyd Dumas
Thomas Elder
William Everard
James Hurtle Fisher
Michael Harbison
Edward Hamilton
Edward Angus Hamilton
George Hamilton
Walter Hughes
Walter Watson Hughes
Roland Ellis Jacobs
Philip Levi
G. C. Ligertwood
Charles Mann
George Mayo
Ian McLachlan  
John Morphett
Hugo Carl Emil Muecke
Angas Parsons
A. E. V. Richardson
George Riddoch
John Riddoch
Arthur Rymill
William John Sowden
Samuel Tomkinson
William Wigley

References

External links
 Retrieved 15 January 2021.
Virtual Tour of the Club (requires Flash)
History

 
Buildings and structures in Adelaide
1863 establishments in Australia
Organizations established in 1863
Organisations based in Adelaide
Gentlemen's clubs in Australia
South Australian places listed on the defunct Register of the National Estate
Adelaide Establishment